David Perry is the Global Director of Education for the Comodo Group, a computer security software company. He represents Comodo at industry, government, customer and reseller events worldwide. Long considered a leading authority on computer virus prevention with more than 25 years in the technical support and education field. Perry has appeared at industry trade shows, television and radio broadcasts, and in print media interviews. He is one of the most quoted experts in the field of computer viruses, malware and security education. Prior to working for Comodo, David worked for Trend Micro, Cybermedia, McAfee Associates and Symantec.

Perry has worked in the field since 1991, and in the computer industry since 1979. Perry has been interviewed by Time magazine, The New York Times, The Washington Post, ZDNet and other publications. He has appeared on TV and radio all over the world, including Good Morning America, BBC News, Fox News and ABC News. He is a co-host of The Personal Computer Radio Show on WBAI.

He lives in Huntington Beach, California with his wife, Margaret. Perry practices close-up stage magic in his spare time. Recently, he became a member of the Magic Circle of London.

References

External links

Businesspeople in software
Living people
Year of birth missing (living people)